A Sunday morning talk show is a television program with a news/talk/public affairs–hybrid format that is broadcast on Sunday mornings. This type of program originated in the United States, and has since been used in other countries.

Overview
These programs typically focus on current events that occurred during the previous week, with a main focus on political and sociopolitical topics (including discussions on public policy, national security, the economy and world events such as geopolitical and military conflicts). These programs often feature national leaders in politics and public life as guests to discuss the topics featured in that week's broadcast, in the form of one-on-one interviews with the program's moderator on a particular story as well as roundtable discussions in a multiple-topic debate format involving the moderator and a panel of (usually between four and six) guests. Depending on the country, some programs may also incorporate contribution reports from members of the network or television station's reporting staff on certain news stories featured in that week's edition. However, if breaking news occurs during the program, the regular format is often unseen or limited that week in order to provide rolling live news coverage.

Sunday morning talk shows by country

United States

The "Big Five" English language shows
Since the establishment of the Fox News bureau in 1996, five major Sunday morning talk shows have been generally recognized in media coverage of the format:

Prior to 2009, CNN's Sunday morning talk show was Late Edition.

Other American programs

While these are the "Big Five" that are universally included in the definition, not all of these programs air in every market, and there are some other shows that are occasionally included in this category. Two relatively recent Sunday morning talk shows broadcast in the Spanish language:

Other English language examples include NBC's syndicated The Chris Matthews Show, Bloomberg Television's Political Capital with Al Hunt, the PBS roundtables (often broadcast other days than Sunday) This is America with Dennis Wholey, Washington Week, and Inside Washington, and the originally PBS, later commercially syndicated The McLaughlin Group. FishbowlDC includes all the shows listed in Daniel W. Reilly's definition for Politico'''s "Sunday Morning Tip Sheet," plus CN8's Roll Call TV with Robert Traynham and other programs, including CNN's Reliable Sources, Fareed Zakaria GPS, Beyond the Politics with William Bennett and POTUS08's Post Politics Program used to be listed in this category but are no longer considered so. C-SPAN's Newsmakers, TV One's Washington Watch, Sinclair Broadcast Group's Full Measure with Sharyl Attkisson, Hearst Television's Matter of Fact with Soledad O'Brien, Gray Television's Full Court Press with Greta Van Susteren, Fox News' Sunday Morning Futures, and (until Tim Russert's 2008 death) MSNBC's Tim Russert Show among several others.

C-SPAN Radio provides a commercial-free rebroadcast of all five shows in rapid succession, beginning at 12 noon Eastern. Other radio stations rebroadcast some of the shows with commercials on Sunday afternoons.

Many local television stations (both commercial and non-commercial) also produce their own programs that air in this time frame, generally focusing on local or state politics rather than national issues, and may play off the title of the network shows, such as Hartford, Connecticut's WFSB-TV, a CBS affiliate which titles their weekly program dealing with state and local issues Face the State, a title also seen on KTVN in Reno/Carson City, Nevada and WHP-TV in Harrisburg, Pennsylvania, all of which serve state capital cities. The member stations of PBS also often produce their state/local political affairs programming to air on Friday nights as a lead-out of Washington Week.

Characteristics of guests

The prominent guests appearing on these programs include U.S. Senators, U.S. Representatives, state governors, candidates for President and Vice president, cabinet secretaries, White House officials, and directors of federal agencies. U.S. military leaders, ambassadors, and religious leaders as well as prominent journalists and commentators. Members of prominent think tanks such as Brookings, Center for American Progress, AEI, Cato, Hoover, and Heritage also are often invited to appear on the Sunday morning talk shows.

Various studies have criticized the shows for inviting predominantly white male guests. A study of the three shows on ABC, CBS and NBC from 1997 to 2005 found that the balance between Republicans and Democrats was fairly equal (52% Republicans), 61% of the journalists on the shows were conservative during the Clinton administration and that rose to 69% when George W. Bush's was president. In 2010, a study found that a relatively small number of senior senators, all of whom were white males, accounted for the majority of all Congressional guests on the five most popular shows. In 2021, the Women's Media Center published a study that showed overall 70% of the guests were male.

The Full Ginsburg
The programs are generally aired live or pre-recorded, broadcasting from Washington, D.C., providing easy access to many political leaders. Many individuals appear via satellite or in studio for two or more of the programs on a given Sunday. Since Fox News Sundays debut in 1996, several individuals have appeared on all five programs on the same day. William H. Ginsburg, attorney for Monica Lewinsky's family during the Lewinsky scandal, was the first to perform what would be named in his honor as the "Full Ginsburg." More common is an interviewee appearing on different shows in consecutive weeks; for instance, a Presidential candidate may appear on Meet the Press one week, This Week the next, and Fox News Sunday the week after that.

Australia
Currently, only two Sunday morning political programs exist in Australia. This includes Insiders on the ABC and the upcoming Speers on Sunday on Sky News Live. Former shows include Network Ten's Meet the Press (1992-2013), Nine Network's Sunday (1981–2008), Sky News Live's Sunday Agenda (2010-2017) and The Bolt Report (2011-2015). The latter became a nightly primetime show in 2016. The three free-to-air commercial broadcasters air general morning news programs Weekend Sunrise (Seven), Weekend Today (Nine) and Studio 10 (Ten) which include some political coverage.

Note

Canada

Similar programming to Sunday morning talk shows are aired on other days in Canada, including:
 CBC Radio One airs a Saturday morning political talk show, The House, currently hosted by Catherine Cullen.
 CBC News Network airs the weekday daily political talk show Power & Politics, currently hosted by David Cochrane.
 CTV News Channel airs the weekday daily political talk show  Power Play, currently hosted by Vassy Kapelos.

United Kingdom
Similar practice occurs in the UK, in the form of shows such as The Andrew Marr Show on the BBC and Sunday Live with Adam Boulton on Sky News. However, these shows have a somewhat-broader range, often interviewing figures from the arts, popular entertainment, and sports in addition to political leaders, similar in format to CBS News Sunday Morning in the United States. The first such Sunday show in Britain was Weekend World, which was produced by London Weekend Television for the ITV network from 1972 to 1988.

Japan
There are several political Sunday morning talk shows in Japan, most are often broadcast live from studios in Tokyo (Nichiyō Tōron: Kioichō, Shin Hōdō 2001: Daiba, Sunday Frontline: Roppongi), Jiji Hōdan is usually prerecorded on Friday evening.Nichiyō Tōron by public broadcaster NHK often features one politician from every party represented in the National Diet, in many cases the parties' Diet Affairs Council Chairmen. The latter was generally the case with Kokkai Tōronkai ("Diet forum"), one of several alternating NHK talk shows about political and economic issues sharing the same Sunday morning programming slot before they were replaced by Nichiyō Tōron'' in 1994. It had initially been a NHK radio talk show and was simultaneously broadcast on television starting in the 1950s.

References

Television news